Stipanovich is a surname, an anglicized form of Stipanović. Notable people with the surname include:

John McKager Stipanovich (born 1948), American politician from Florida
Steve Stipanovich (born 1960), American basketball player

See also
 

Surnames from given names